Qu'a: Live at the Iridium, Vol. 1 is a live album by pianist Cecil Taylor. It was recorded at the Iridium Jazz Club in New York City in March 1998, and was released later that year by Cadence Jazz Records. On the album, Taylor is joined by saxophonist Harri Sjöström, bassist Dominic Duval, and drummer Jackson Krall. The recording is the companion to Qu'a Yuba: Live at the Iridium, Vol. 2, recorded on the same date.

Reception

In a review for AllMusic, Steve Loewy wrote: "During the course of more than one hour, Taylor and his quartet perform only one piece, but do it with such exquisite finesse that it incorporates dozens of shades and styles of expression. The instrumentation may look conventional... but as with any Taylor group, the music is unique and astonishing... The results are enthralling in a very Tayloresque way."

The authors of the Penguin Guide to Jazz Recordings wrote: "Krall... is inventive and often delicately propulsive: his brushwork halfway through the first set is impeccable. Taylor's intensity seems as trenchant as ever."

Track listing

 "Qu'a" (Cecil Taylor) – 1:02:25

Personnel 
 Cecil Taylor – piano
 Harri Sjöström – soprano saxophone
 Dominic Duval – bass
 Jackson Krall – drums

References

1998 live albums
Cecil Taylor live albums
Cadence Jazz Records live albums